A popcorn maker (also called a popcorn popper) is a machine used to pop popcorn. Since ancient times, popcorn has been a popular snack food, produced through the explosive expansion of kernels of heated corn (maize). Commercial large-scale popcorn machines were invented by Charles Cretors in the late 19th century. Many types of small-scale home methods for popping corn also exist.

Commercial popcorn machines are commonly found in movie theaters and carnivals, producing popcorn in a pan of hot oil, so that approximately 45% of the calories are derived from fat. Hot-air popcorn poppers for home use appeared the late 1970s; these produce popcorn with only 5% of its calories derived from fat.

The majority of popcorn sold for home consumption is now packaged in a microwave popcorn bag for use in a microwave oven. As a result, the popularity of popcorn makers for home use has greatly decreased in the last few decades.

History 

Charles Cretors traveled the Midwest, settling in Fort Scott, Kansas, and then Decatur, Illinois. He worked in the painting and contracting business and later opened a bakery and eventually a confectionery shop. To broaden his offerings in the confectionery store, he bought a peanut roaster, which he redesigned to improve its operation. Driven by a small steam engine, it was the first automated peanut roaster. In 1885, he moved his family to Chicago to focus on selling his machine.

To test his peanut roaster and earn money, Cretors purchased a vendor's license and placed the machine on the sidewalk in front of his shop. The date on the license, December 2, 1885, marks the inception of C. Cretors & Company. A traveling salesman, J.M. Savage, offered to sell the machine in his territory, and became Cretors' first salesman. Cretors' machines, being automated, made operation more predictable; in addition, the novelty of the steam engine and the Tosty Rosty Man, a small mechanical clown that acted as a merchandiser, made the machines themselves attractive.

By 1893, Cretors had created a steam-powered machine that could roast 12 pounds of peanuts and 20 pounds of coffee, pop corn, and bake chestnuts. Since popcorn was becoming a popular choice for snack food, Cretors redesigned his machine to roast peanuts and pop popcorn at the same time. It was the first automated machine that could pop popcorn uniformly in its own seasonings, guaranteeing a predictable product. Cretors applied for a patent on his automated peanut roaster and popcorn popper machine on August 10, 1891, and U.S. Patent 506,207 was granted on October 10, 1893.

Cretors took his new popcorn wagon and peanut roaster to the midway of Chicago's Columbian Exposition in 1893 and introduced the new corn product to the public in a newly designed machine that included a popcorn wagon.

Variants 

Specialized popcorn pots, also called stove-top poppers, have been marketed under various brand names, including The Detonator, Whirley Pop, Theater II and Sweet & Easy; all of them are basically a pot that has an integrated stirring blade operated by turning a crank. This is to prevent burning of the kernels on the bottom and, under limited conditions, enables users to make sweetened popcorn by mixing sugar directly with the kernels before they pop.

In 1978, Presto introduced the Popcorn Pumper, a popper for home use that  used hot air blown up through the kernels. By cooking without oil, it reduced the calories and fat in the finished product. It was also faster and easier than pan fry popping.

Home popcorn makers are also available, consisting of an electrically heated circular tray with a powered stirring arm, into which corn and oil can be placed, and a dome-shaped cover that often doubles as a serving bowl.

Around 1974, Pillsbury made microwave popcorn available for sale in vending machines; as microwave oven sales increased, the product was released to supermarkets. This reduced the need for a separate kitchen appliance, and more consumers now buy microwave popcorn bags than use home machines. To improve flavor, texture and shelf life of pre-packaged microwave popcorn, companies started adding diacetyl, PFOA, and trans-fats to the packages, which has led to concern among health-conscious consumers.

Gallery

See also 
 National Presto Industries
 Jiffy Pop

References 

Cooking appliances
American inventions
Popcorn
Products introduced in 1893
19th-century inventions